"Only With You" is the first single from the twelfth Blue System album, Body to Body. Was published in 1995 by Hanseatic M.V. and was distributed by BMG. The lyrics, music, arrangements and production were made by Dieter Bohlen.

Track listing 

 CD-Maxi Hansa 74321 37368 2 (BMG) / EAN 0743213736822 28.05.1996
 Only With You (Radio Version) - 3:22
 Only With You (Extended Version) - 5:15
 Only With You (Labadi Club Mix) - 5:00

Charts 

Blue System songs
1996 singles
Songs written by Dieter Bohlen
Song recordings produced by Dieter Bohlen
1996 songs
Ariola Records singles